The 1924 West Virginia Mountaineers football team represented West Virginia University as an independent during the 1924 college football season. In their fourth and final season under head coach Clarence Spears, the Mountaineers compiled an 8–1 record and outscored opponents by a combined total of 282 to 47. The team played its home games at Mountaineer Field in Morgantown, West Virginia.

Guard Walter Mahan and end Fred Graham were selected as first-team All-Americans. Fred Graham was also the team captain.

Schedule

References

West Virginia
West Virginia Mountaineers football seasons
West Virginia Mountaineers football